The Heppner Gazette-Times is a newspaper serving Morrow County in the U.S. state of Oregon.

History 
The Gazette was founded in 1883. At the time of its launch, the city of Heppner had a population of 370; the newspaper was started with contributions from a number of citizens.

Vawter Crawford bought the paper in 1910, and two years later purchased the Heppner Times, which had been founded in 1897, and merged the two papers. It was a consistently Republican newspaper. Archives from 1951 through 1976, as well as many pages from its predecessor newspapers, are available through the Oregon Digital Newspaper Program.

Today, the newspaper has a circulation of about 1,883 and is owned by David Sykes.

References

External links 
  Information at Heppner.net] (no official web site?)
 Entry at Chronicling America, U.S. Library of Congress.

Newspapers published in Oregon
Morrow County, Oregon
1883 establishments in Oregon
Newspapers established in 1883